William Henry Donner (1864–1953) was an American businessman and philanthropist, born in Columbus, Indiana. He graduated from Hanover College in 1887.

Business career
Early in adulthood, Donner managed the family-owned grain mill, and in his twenties, he invested in Indiana natural gas and real estate. He founded the National Tin Plate Company, originally based in North Anderson, Indiana, and obtained a patent for an innovation in tin plate rolling processes.

Donner then shifted his energies from Indiana to the Monongahela Valley of southwestern Pennsylvania. In 1897, his National Tin Plate Company was the first employer in the newly created community of Monessen, Pennsylvania. The town's main street was named "Donner Avenue" in his honor.

Donner then sold his tin plate company and used the proceeds to create Union Steel Company (later American Steel and Wire Company), in the new community of Donora, Pennsylvania, in 1899-1900. The "Don" in "Donora" was in recognition of William Donner's key role in the founding of that community. In creating Union Steel Company, Donner received financial backing from Henry Clay Frick, Andrew W. Mellon, and Richard B. Mellon, in addition to Donner's own funds. The town was the site of the Donora Smog of 1948.

After selling his Donora-based company in 1903, Donner became president of Cambria Steel Company and served as chairman of the board of the Pennsylvania Steel Company. Near the end of his career, he created the Buffalo-based Donner Steel Company, which he sold in 1929.

In 1914, a new cargo ship (at 524 feet long and 9,600 tons one of the largest on the Great Lakes at the time), the William H. Donner was named in his honor at the Great Lakes Engineering Works and shipyard in Ashtabula, Ohio. Still holding the name, it had functioned since 1969 as a stationary crane ship and cargo transfer hull in Marinette, Wisconsin. It was owned by K.K. Integrated Logistics. Her final retirement came in 2015; as of March, 2016, the 102-year-old vessel had been moved and is now in the Menominee river on the Michigan side awaiting scrapping. The ship's pilot house and superstructure had been removed several years earlier.

Later life
Donner's son, Joseph, died in 1929, from cancer. In 1932, Donner turned his attention to philanthropy, with a special interest in cancer research. He founded two notable foundations that are still in operation today, the William H. Donner Foundation in the United States, and the Donner Canadian Foundation in Canada.

William H. Donner died in Montreal in 1953.

The Donner Center was donated to the City of Columbus, Indiana, in 1947 from William H. Donner and sits in Donner Park, Columbus' oldest park.  For 70 years, the Columbus, Indiana Parks and Recreation administrative facility has served as the home for youth and adult programs, community events, family reunions, wedding receptions and provided meeting space for community clubs and local businesses.

After his death
In 1958, the William H. Donner Foundation used $2.5 million to fund five chairs in science at MIT, Harvard, Yale, Princeton and the University of Pennsylvania thus creating the title of Donner Professor. The Donner Building was funded by W H Donner kin 1947-48 for medical research @ McGill University. It is now part of the Dentistry faculty. Mr Donner died in Montreal in 1953.(McGill University history of the Donner Building)

The Donner Canadian Foundation was established in 1950 and for 43 years was a typical, uncontroversial Canadian charitable fund.

In 1993, the conservative American Donner heirs who control the foundation changed its primary focus to that of supporting conservative research. 
 
From 1993 to 1999, under the leadership of executive directors Devon Gaffney Cross and then Patrick Luciani, the foundation provided the seed money to start several conservative Canadian think-tanks and publications, and became the "lifeblood of conservative research" in Canada.

In 1999, the American Donner heirs who control the foundation began donating more of its money to land and wildlife conservation, international development, medical research and the arts, reducing funding of conservative research (though it is still one of the most generous benefactors to the right in Canada).

References

1864 births
1953 deaths
Hanover College alumni
American businesspeople
People from Washington County, Pennsylvania
People from Westmoreland County, Pennsylvania
People from Columbus, Indiana
Date of death missing
Date of birth unknown